American singer Mandy Moore has released seven studio albums, four compilation albums, two video albums, nineteen singles, and thirteen music videos. After being spotted singing at a recording studio by an artists and repertoire representative for Epic Records, Moore was signed to Sony Music. Moore had sold 2.7 million album sales in the US as of 2009. Her debut album, So Real, was released in December 1999. The album performed moderately on the charts, peaking at number thirty-one on the Billboard 200 and was certified Platinum by the Recording Industry Association of America (RIAA). According to Nielsen SoundScan, So Real had sold about 950,000 copies in the United States by June 2009. Her debut single, "Candy", peaked at number forty-one on the US Billboard Hot 100, and was certified Gold by the RIAA. It also reached the top forty in Canada, France, Ireland, and Switzerland and the top ten in Australia, New Zealand, and the United Kingdom. In Australia the song peaked at number two on the ARIA Singles Chart and was certified Platinum by the Australian Recording Industry Association (ARIA). So Real was followed up with I Wanna Be with You, in May 2000. In North America, it was marketed as a "new version" of So Real, with remixed tracks and a few new songs. The album reached number twenty-one on the Billboard 200 and was certified Gold by the RIAA. It also went on to sell about 805,000 copies in the US by June 2009. The album spawned the single "I Wanna Be with You", which peaked at number twenty-four on the Hot 100, becoming Moore's only top-thirty song in the US and her highest peak to date. The song also reached number thirteen in Australia and was certified Gold by the ARIA.

In 2001, Mandy Moore released her self-titled second studio album, which was influenced by pop rock and Middle Eastern music. It debuted at number thirty-five on the Billboard 200, and was later certified Gold by the RIAA. By June 2009, it had sold 464,000 copies in the US and spawned three singles. The lead single, "In My Pocket", peaked at number 11 Australia and was certified Gold by the ARIA. The follow-up single, "Crush", peaked at number twenty-five in Australia. Coverage, Moore's third studio album and her first cover album, was released in October 2003. The album contained covers of songs from the 1980s and 1990s like the ones of Carole King, Joni Mitchell and Carly Simon. It debuted and peaked at number fourteen on the Billboard 200 chart. The position remains her highest peak on the chart to date, and as of June 2009 has sold 294,000 copies in the US. Moore and Sony parted ways in 2004, citing creative differences. A compilation album, The Best of Mandy Moore, followed the split. The compilation reached number 148 on the Billboard 200 and has sold about 104,000 copies in the US. A DVD of the same title, containing Moore's music videos from 1999 to 2003, was also released.

In July 2006, Moore signed a record deal with The Firm, a record label run by EMI. The singer's fourth studio album, Wild Hope, was released in June 2007. A departure from her previous style, Moore incorporated folk and acoustic music into the album. The album peaked at number thirty on the Billboard 200 chart and went on to sell about 109,000 copies in the US. In May 2009, Moore's fifth studio album, Amanda Leigh, was released through Storefront Recordings. Following the same musical style as Wild Hope, the album's title was taken from Moore's full name. It debuted at number twenty-five on the Billboard 200 and has sold 16,000 copies in the US, as of June 2009. The singles from Wild Hope and Amanda Leigh were commercially unsuccessful and failed to chart. On March 6, 2020, she released her sixth studio album, Silver Landings, her first album in 11 years.

Albums

Studio albums

Reissues

Compilation albums

Singles

Notes
A  "In My Pocket" did not enter the Billboard Hot 100 but peaked on the Bubbling Under Hot 100 Singles chart at number two.
B  "Extraordinary" did not enter the Billboard Hot 100 but peaked on the Bubbling Under Hot 100 Singles chart at number two.
C  When I Wasn't Watching" did not enter the Billboard Hot 100 but peaked on the US Alternative Digital Song Sales chart at number twenty four.

Soundtrack appearances

Videography

Video releases

Music videos

Music video appearances

Notes

† The Country codes used are per the ISO 3166-1 alpha-3 standard. A complete list of the codes and their corresponding counties can be found here. Please note that the United Kingdom is an exception here, listed as "UK" instead of "GBR" (UK is an ISO 3166-1 alpha-2 code listed under Exceptional reservations).

References

External links
 
 Mandy Moore videography at MTV.com
 [ Mandy Moore discography at Allmusic]

Pop music discographies
Discography
Discographies of American artists